The 1952 European Women Basketball Championship was the 3rd regional championship held by FIBA Europe for women. The competition was held in Moscow, Soviet Union, on the Central Dynamo Stadium and took place May 18–25, 1952. The Soviet Union won their second gold medal in a row, with Czechoslovakia and Hungary winning silver and bronze, respectively.

Squads

Preliminary round
The teams where divided in three groups of 4 squads each, where the first from each group would go on to compete for the gold medal.

Group A

Group B

Group C

Final round
Four new groups were formed, with the three 1st, 2nd, 3rd and 4th places from each group to determine the final standings.

1st to 3rd Place

4th to 6th Place

7th to 9th Place

10th to 12th Place

Final ranking

External links
FIBA Archive

1952
1952 in women's basketball
1952 in Soviet women's sport
International basketball competitions hosted by the Soviet Union
Women's basketball in the Soviet Union
1952 in Moscow
Sports competitions in Moscow
May 1952 sports events in Europe
1951–52 in European basketball